Abazar (also Romanized as Abāz̄ar; also known as Abū Z̄ar, Abūz̄ar, Emāmzādeh Zeydān, and Imāmzādeh Zaidān) is a village in Sardasht Rural District, Zeydun District, Behbahan County, Khuzestan Province, Iran. At the 2006 census, its population was 402, in 85 families.

References 

Populated places in Behbahan County